The National Association of Drug Court Professionals (NADCP) is an American 501(c)(3) non-profit organization devoted to furthering the treatment court model and criminal justice reform worldwide.

About
NADCP is the premier training, membership and advocacy organization representing the more than 3,000 drug courts and other treatment courts, including DWI courts and veterans treatment courts across the United States. Through its divisions, the National Drug Court Institute, the National Center for DWI Courts and Justice For Vets, NADCP trains and provides technical assistance to thousands of treatment court professionals each year. NADCP regularly publishes evidence-based materials and guides designed to give treatment courts the tools needed for an effective program. In addition, NADCP takes the lead in advocating for treatment courts in the United States Congress and other governmental bodies nationwide.

Divisions 
NADCP operates its training and technical support services through three divisions:

The National Drug Court Institute is the division of NADCP charged with administering training and technical assistance to adult drug courts, tribal healing to wellness courts and statewide treatment court conferences.

The National Center for DWI Courts provides training to new and established DWI courts. NCDC also works to promote awareness of DWI courts and impaired driving nationally.

Justice For Vets provides training to veterans treatment courts and works to bring awareness to the unique challenges veterans face when returning from service. The division also operates the Justice For Vets National Veteran Mentor Corps, a group of veterans trained to be mentors to fellow veterans participating in a veterans treatment court program.

Adult Drug Court Best Practice Standards 
In 2013 and 2015, NADCP released volumes I and II of the Adult Drug Court Best Practice Standards. Representing 25 years of empirical study on addiction, pharmacology, behavioral health, and criminal justice, the standards are the foundation upon which all adult drug courts should operate.

NADCP works at a local, state and federal level to ensure the standards are universally implemented.

The Adult Drug Court Best Practice Standards:

 Target Population
 Historically Disadvantaged Groups
 Roles and Responsibilities of the Judge
 Incentives, Sanctions and Therapeutic Adjustments
 Substance Abuse Treatment
 Complementary Treatment and Social Services
 Drug and Alcohol Testing
 Multidisciplinary Team
 Census and Caseloads
 Monitoring and Evaluation

Advancing Justice Initiative 
In July 2017, NADCP launched Advancing Justice, an initiative to lead evidence-based justice reform. Advancing Justice seeks to identify and promote the proven and promising solutions for the justice system that are fair, affective and actionable at every intervention point – from entry into the justice system to reentry into society. For its first two projects, the initiative partnered with Sesame Street in Communities to connect their evidence-based tools for children in crisis to justice professionals; and released the inaugural edition of the Journal for Advancing Justice focusing on "Identifying and Rectifying Racial, Ethnic, and Gender Disparities in Treatment Courts."

Conference 
NADCP’s Annual Training Conference is the world’s largest on mental health, substance use and criminal justice. It annually hosts nearly 6,000 attendees from across the world in nearly every discipline within the criminal justice field as well as clinicians, treatment providers and veterans.

The 2019 Annual Training Conference is July 14–17 in National Harbor, Maryland.

References

External links
 National Association of Drug Court Professionals
National Drug Court Institute
Advancing Justice
NADCP Annual Training Conference
National Center for DWI Courts
Justice For Vets

Legal organizations based in the United States
Law-related professional associations
Legal advocacy organizations in the United States